Gary John White (born 25 July 1974) is an English football coach and former player who last managed Malaysia Super League club Kedah Darul Aman  as a technical director.

Early life
White was born in Southampton, England, and had a successful youth playing career. He was selected for both the Southampton City and Hampshire County representative teams and was a future prospect for Southampton FC.

Playing career
White signed for Fremantle City Soccer Club in the Western Australia State League in 1994, where he played two seasons for the club. Prior to signing for the Australian outfit, White played for Bognor Regis Town.

Managerial career

British Virgin Islands
White was the national technical director and national team head coach for the British Virgin Islands, where he had success during the 2000 CONCACAF Gold Cup qualification which resulted in the national team shooting up the FIFA World Rankings at 28 places. White is still one of the youngest ever national team coach when he took his role at 24, and was also one of the youngest ever coaches to compete in a FIFA World Cup qualification at 25.

Bahamas
White signed with the Bahamas in September 1999, where he was National Team Coach and Technical Director. During his tenure with the Bahamas, White moved the national team 55 places up the FIFA world ranking. Also as technical director White directed and oversaw all National Team programmes and National Staff Coaches in preparation for all FIFA and CONCACAF Competitions, including coaching education for the National coaches. White also designed and implemented a National Coaching Philosophy as part of the International Teams and Player Development Strategy.

White coached and managed more than 65 FIFA Certified International matches and also during his time as manager the Bahamas was FIFA's highest mover in 2006.

In 2007 White took the position of technical director of the Snohomish United youth soccer organization. In 2009, he left for the Seattle Sounders elite player development program.

Washington State Soccer and Seattle Sounders FC (EPD) Technical Director
During his time in Seattle White lead the daily technical operations for the Sounders FC Elite Player Development Program and Washington States coaching education initiatives. During White's time in Seattle the Washington State / Sounders FC Elite Player Development Program became a powerhouse in the nation on and off the field and lead the country with their modern player & coaching development initiatives which, in the end, forced US Youth Soccers ODP (Olympic Development Program) to modernise and become more elite. During White's tenure the Washington State / Sounders FC EPD program won eight US Youth Soccer Championships in two years, these were the first championships that Washington had won in over 15 barren years and made the program California South's biggest rival in the country. White was named in the US Soccer Task Force for National player Development along with such names as Mia Hamm and Claudio Reyna.

Guam
On 1 February 2012, White was appointed as head coach of Guam and whilst also serving as the federation's technical director.

The Guam national team shocked the world under White most notably in June 2015 when after two games of the 2018 FIFA World Cup qualifiers they lead group D. The group included world heavy weights Iran and regionally strong outfits Oman, India and Turkmenistan. Guam with White as the coach comfortably beat both India and Turkmenistan and tied with Oman. Guam  reached their best ever FIFA ranking under White's management with a remarkable increase of 50+ places.

Due to the success of the Matao, FIFA Futbol Mundial, in episode 137, and various other world media have featured White and the progress of the Guam national football team.

Shanghai Shenxin
On 30 May 2016, White was appointed as head coach of Shanghai Shenxin in the China League One, with the side facing a relegation battle. White successfully guided them to safety and a commendable top 10 place finish, while breaking various club records. His records include highest ever scoring wins for both home and away games. The team ended up being the 2nd highest scoring team in the league, just behind Fabio Cannavaro's Tianjin Quanjian. On 26 November 2016, Shanghai Shenxin announced that they had parted company with White by mutual agreement, which shocked fans due to the positive impact White had brought to the club.

Chinese Taipei
On 15 September 2017, White was officially announced as head coach and technical director of the Chinese Taipei, with his first games in charge coming against Mongolia and Bahrain on the 5 and 10 October. His appointment saw an immediate improvement in results for Chinese Taipei, with a 4-2 friendly win against Mongolia in his first game, and a shock 2–1 win against Bahrain in a 2019 AFC Asian Cup qualifier. Before White was appointed, Chinese Taipei had lost the reverse fixture 5–0 to Bahrain.

White's winning percentage with Chinese Taipei was 58.3% and the national team won every home match under his leadership. The team also reached their highest FIFA ranking of 121st  during his tenure.

Hong Kong
White was announced as Hong Kong's head coach on 10 September 2018. 
White's positive impact on results for Hong Kong has been immediate, as White lead them to qualification to the 2019 East Asia Cup finals after beating DPR Korea, Taiwan and Mongolia to the top spot during the semi finals. This was the first time since 2010 that Hong Kong have qualified for East Asia's premier competition.

On 11 Dec 2018, White tendered his resignation in order to join a club in Japan.

Tokyo Verdy
On 12 December 2018, it was announced White would be leaving his role at Hong Kong to take over at J2 League club Tokyo Verdy.

White resigned from his post on 16 July 2019 with Verdy 13th in the table.

Nantong Zhiyun
White was appointed as manager of Chinese League One club Nantong Zhiyun on 20 August 2019.

References

External links

1974 births
Living people
Footballers from Southampton
English footballers
Association football wingers
Bognor Regis Town F.C. players
Fremantle Spirit SC players
English expatriate footballers
English expatriate sportspeople in Australia
Expatriate soccer players in Australia
English football managers
British Virgin Islands national football team managers
Bahamas national football team managers
Seattle Sounders FC non-playing staff
Guam national football team managers
Shanghai Shenxin F.C. managers
Chinese Taipei national football team managers
Hong Kong national football team managers
Tokyo Verdy managers
Nantong Zhiyun F.C. managers
China League One managers
J2 League managers
English expatriate football managers
English expatriate sportspeople in the British Virgin Islands
English expatriate sportspeople in the Bahamas
English expatriate sportspeople in the United States
English expatriate sportspeople in Guam
English expatriate sportspeople in Taiwan
English expatriate sportspeople in Hong Kong
English expatriate sportspeople in China
English expatriate sportspeople in Japan
Expatriate football managers in the British Virgin Islands
Expatriate football managers in the Bahamas
Expatriate football managers in Guam
Expatriate football managers in Taiwan
Expatriate football managers in Hong Kong
Expatriate football managers in China
Expatriate football managers in Japan